Dainelli is an Italian surname. Notable people with the surname include:

Dario Dainelli (born 1979), Italian footballer
Giotto Dainelli (1878–1968), Italian geographer, geologist, paleontologist, traveller, and writer
Luca Dainelli, Italian diplomat
Rosa Dainelli (1901–1973), Italian doctor who worked in Ethiopia during World War II

Italian-language surnames